This is a list of rural localities in Chechnya. Chechnya, officially the Chechen Republic, is a federal subject (a republic) of Russia. It is a Federal Subject of Russia located in the North Caucasus, and within  of the Caspian Sea. The capital of the republic is the city of Grozny.

Achkhoy-Martanovsky District 
Rural localities in Achkhoy-Martanovsky District:

 Achkhoy-Martan
 Davydenko
 Katyr-Yurt
 Khambi-Irze
 Novy Sharoy
 Samashki
 Shaami-Yurt
 Stary Achkhoy
 Valerik
 Yandi
 Zakan-Yurt

Galanchozhsky District 
Rural localities in Galanchozhsky District:

 Aka-Bass
 Khaybakha
 Yalkhara

Groznensky District 
Rural localities in Groznensky District:

 Khankala
 Starye Atagi
 Tolstoy-Yurt

Gudermessky District 
Rural localities in Gudermessky District:

 Oyskhara

Itum-Kalinsky District 
Rural localities in Itum-Kalinsky District:

 Itum-Kale

Kurchaloyevsky District 
Rural localities in Kurchaloyevsky District:

 Achereshki
 Akhkinchu-Borzoy
 Akhmat-Yurt
 Alleroy
 Bachi-Yurt
 Belty
 Dzhaglargi
 Dzhigurty
 Enikali
 Geldagana
 Khidi-Khutor
 Koren-Benoy
 Kurchaloy
 Mayrtup
 Niki-Khita
 Regita
 Tsotsi-Yurt
 Yalkhoy-Mokhk

Nadterechny District 
Rural localities in Nadterechny District:

 Goragorsky
 Znamenskoye

Naursky District 
Rural localities in Naursky District:

 Chernokozovo
 Naurskaya

Nozhay-Yurtovsky District 
Rural localities in Nozhay-Yurtovsky District:

 Benoy
 Meskety
 Nozhay-Yurt

Sernovodsky District 
Rural localities in Sernovodsky District:

 Assinovskaya
 Bamut
 Sernovodskoye

Shalinsky District, Chechen Republic 
Rural localities in Shalinsky District, Chechen Republic:

 Avtury
 Novye Atagi

Sharoysky District 
Rural localities in Sharoysky District:

 Khimoy
 Sharoy

Shatoysky District 
Rural localities in Shatoysky District:

 Borzoy
 Shatoy

Shelkovskoy District 
Rural localities in Shelkovskoy District:

 Shelkovskaya

Urus-Martanovsky District 
Rural localities in Urus-Martanovsky District:

 Roshni-Chu

Vedensky District 
Rural localities in Vedensky District:

 Agishbatoy
 Belgatoy
 Benoy
 Dargo
 Dutsin-Khutor
 Dyshne-Vedeno
 Elistanzhi
 Ersenoy
 Eshilkhatoy
 Gezinchu
 Guni
 Kharachoy
 Khattuni
 Khazhi-Yurt
 Makhkety
 Marzoy-Mokhk
 Mekhkadettan-Irze
 Mesedoy
 Nizhny Kurchali
 Selmentauzen
 Shirdi-Mokhk
 Sredny Kurchali
 Tazen-Kala
 Tevzana
 Tsa-Vedeno
 Vedeno
 Verkhatoy
 Verkhny Kurchali
 Verkhny Tsa-Vedeno
 Zelamkhin-Kotar

See also 
 
 Lists of rural localities in Russia

References 

Chechnya